Amorōnagu (天降女子, "girl who fell from heaven"), is a tennyo (celestial maiden) from the folklore of the island of Amami Ōshima, in Kagoshima Prefecture. She bathes in pools and waterfalls in ravines.

References
 

Japanese legendary creatures
Female legendary creatures